Bunić can refer to:

 House of Bunić, Croatian noble family
 Bunić, Croatia, village in Croatia.